Baker University is a private university in Baldwin City, Kansas. Founded in 1858, it was the first four-year university in Kansas and is affiliated with the United Methodist Church. Baker University is made up of four schools. The College of Arts and Sciences and the undergraduate courses in the School of Education (SOE) are located on the campus in Baldwin City, Kansas. The School of Professional and Graduate Studies (SPGS) and the graduate branch of the SOE serve nontraditional students on campuses in Overland Park, Kansas, and online. The School of Nursing, which is operated in partnership with Stormont Vail Health in Topeka, offers a Bachelor of Science in Nursing (BSN) and an online Master of Science in Nursing (MSN). Enrollment in all four schools has grown to a student population more than 3,000, with about 900 students on the Baldwin City campus.

History

Baker University was founded in 1858 and named for Osman Cleander Baker, a Methodist Episcopal biblical scholar and bishop. The schoolwhich is the oldest, continually operating institution of higher learning in the statewas the first four-year university in Kansas and funds were raised by local donations and donors from the East. Baker's first president, Werter R. Davis, a minister and Civil War officer, served from 1858 to 1862. The original campus building, now known as Old Castle Museum, houses a museum of the university and Baldwin City.

Athletics 

The Baker athletic teams are called the Wildcats. The university is a member of the National Association of Intercollegiate Athletics (NAIA), primarily competing as a founding member of the Heart of America Athletic Conference (HAAC) since its inception in the 1971–72 academic year. The Wildcats previously competed in the Kansas Collegiate Athletic Conference (KCAC) from 1902–03 to 1970–71.

Baker competes in 23 intercollegiate varsity sports: Men's sports include baseball, basketball, bowling, cross country, football, golf, soccer, tennis, track & field and wrestling; while women's sports include basketball, bowling, cross country, golf, soccer, softball, tennis, track & field, volleyball and wrestling; and co-ed sports includes cheerleading, dance and eSports.

Baker was one of the first NAIA schools to take part in the Champions of Character program, which emphasizes respect, servant leadership, integrity, sportsmanship and responsibility. Since 1978 women have been competing in intercollegiate sports at Baker.

Colors
Baker has only one official color: cadmium orange. The only other school in the country to have orange as their only official color is Syracuse University.

Accomplishments
The athletic programs have garnered three individual national championships, 100 All-Americans, and over 100 conference titles. More than 40 Wildcats annually are named NAIA Scholar-Athletes for their success both on the field and in the classroom, and a select few have been named Capital One Academic All-Americans.

Football
In 1890 Baker University won a 22–9 victory against the University of Kansas in the first intercollegiate football game to take place in Kansas.

Campus life

Residential life
Baker University has three residence halls and two apartment buildings for students living on campus. Gessner Hall provides suite style living arrangements for 152 male residents. It was built in 1966, and the building was renovated in 2012. Irwin Hall provides suite style living arrangements for 150 female residents. The newest residence hall is the New Living Center, which houses 190 students in 48 rooms. The New Living Center is the largest on campus, with three stories and six wings totaling 52,000 square feet.

Horn Apartments and Markham Apartments make up the Baker University apartment complex. The complex houses 96 students, selected through an application process. Each furnished apartment is made up of four private bedrooms, which share a kitchen, a living room, and two bathrooms.

Fraternities and Sororities
Greek life at Baker University can trace its beginnings to 1865. Baker student James C. Hall left the school to attend Indiana Asbury University for a year, during which he was initiated into the Lambda chapter of Phi Gamma Delta. Hall returned to Baker University where he and six other students were able to petition Phi Gamma Delta and secure a charter as the Phi chapter. Additional students were initiated over the next couple years, but the fraternity was short-lived at Baker. In 1868, the student members began to become dissatisfied with conditions at the university. Five of the members transferred to Northwestern University in 1869, and they transferred the fraternity charter with them and continued to operate their chapter at Northwestern.

The modern-day Greek system at Baker traces its beginnings to 1889 when the Alpha Omega men's fraternity was established. Six Baker women responded by forming a local sorority in 1890. That local sorority petitioned Delta Delta Delta and became the Lambda chapter in 1895, installed as the first chapter of a national Greek women's organization on the Baker campus. Alpha Omega was later installed as the Gamma Theta chapter of Delta Tau Delta in 1903, after multiple unsuccessful attempts petitioning Phi Delta Theta. Baker University is currently home to eight Greek letter social fraternities and sororities. All are chapters of national organizations, except for Zeta Chi. Founded on May 23, 1905, Zeta Chi is one of the oldest independent fraternities west of the Mississippi River. Alpha Kappa Alpha became the first historically black Greek organization to establish a chapter on Baker University's campus, when it did so in the 1970s. Zeta Phi Beta is currently the only historically black Greek organization with a chapter at Baker.

Notable people

Alumni

James Percy Ault (1881–1929) — geophysicist, oceanographer, and captain of a research vessel
Edith Bideau – singer, music educator
Joseph Bristow – US Senator from Kansas, 1909–1915.
Andrew Cherng – Panda Express founder
Nellie Cline Steenson - Member of the Kansas House of Representatives, Member of the Idaho House of Representatives and member of the Idaho Senate
Don Holter – American Bishop of the United Methodist Church, elected in 1972.
Mike Gardner – head football coach at Tabor College and formerly at Malone University
Janette Hill Knox – temperance reformer, suffragist, teacher, author
George LaFrance – Arena Football League Hall of Fame member
Kevin Mahogany – Jazz Singer.
Andrew Long – Educator in Kansas City, Kansas.
Mike McCarthy – Dallas Cowboys head coach. Winning coach of Super Bowl XLV.
Homer McCrerey – Naval officer and "bioneer"-ing oceanographer.
Candice Millard, Class of 1989, writer, journalist, former writer and editor for National Geographic, author of three books.
Vidal Nuño – Pitcher for the New York Yankees, Arizona Diamondbacks and Seattle Mariners.
Tanner Purdum – New York Jets Long Snapper Since 2010.
William Quayle – American bishop of the Methodist Church, elected in 1908.
Bennett Sims – Sixth bishop of the Episcopal Diocese of Atlanta consecrated as Diocesan Bishop in 1972.
Patrick Tubach, Class of 1996, Academy Award nominee, best visual effects, "Star Trek Into Darkness"
Philip P. Campbell, Class of 1888, US Congressman from Kansas, 1903–1923.
Ernest Eugene Sykes, Class of 1888, prominent businessman and Freemason from New Orleans.

Faculty
Phog Allen – Collegiate basketball coach at Baker University, the University of Central Missouri and the University of Kansas.
Janette Hill Knox – alumni (see above); faculty
Emil S. Liston – basketball coach (1930–1945) and administrator. Inductee to Basketball Hall of Fame and creator of the NAIA college basketball tournament.
John Clark Ridpath – educator, historian, and editor.
William M. Runyan, preacher, songwriter who composed Great Is Thy Faithfulness

References

External links 

 
 Baker athletics website

 
Private universities and colleges in Kansas
Education in Douglas County, Kansas
Educational institutions established in 1858
Buildings and structures in Douglas County, Kansas
1858 establishments in Kansas Territory